Abdullahpur Flyover is a flyover over a road passing over the railway lines in Abdullahpur Chowk in Faisalabad. The project was started by the Chief Minister of Punjab Chaudhry Pervaiz Elahi in 2006 with the amount of Rs. 850 million.

Underpass 
Abdullahpur Underpass is a road underpass in Abdullahpur Chowk. After the flyover was completed, the Government of Punjab is now constructing three underpasses in Abdullahpur Chowk, with a cost of Rs. 1.1 billion.

References 

Bridges in Pakistan
Road interchanges in Pakistan
Streets in Faisalabad